Area codes 973 and 862 are telephone area codes in the North American Numbering Plan (NANP) in the northernmost part of the U.S. state of New Jersey. The numbering plan area (NPA) comprises the counties, or parts, of Bergen, Essex, Hudson, Morris, Passaic, Sussex and Union Counties. Cities in this service area include Newark, Paterson, Clifton, Passaic, Montclair, Morristown, Parsippany, Dover, Maplewood, and The Oranges.

Area code 973 was created on June 1, 1997, in a split of area code 201, which was the original area code for of all of New Jersey when the North American Numbering Plan was inaugurated for nationwide operator dialing in 1947. In 1958, the numbering plan area of 201 was reduced to just northern New Jersey and in 1991 to just the northeastern part through area code splits. Due to the expansion of cell phones, pagers, and fax machines in the 1990s, the area code experienced the possible exhaustion of the numbering pool.

The creation of 973 was intended as a long-term solution. However, within three years it was close to exhaustion once again. For relief, the numbering plan area was assigned a second area code 862 in an overlay plan, making ten-digit dialing mandatory on December 1, 2001. This overlay was rolled out in conjunction with two other overlays in the northern half of the state. Verizon, the main telephone provider in the region, pressed for an overlay in order to spare North Jerseyans the expense and burden of having to change their numbers for the second time in a decade.

See also
List of New Jersey area codes

References

External links

List of exchanges from AreaCodeDownload.com, 973 Area Code

Telecommunications-related introductions in 1997
973 And 862
973 And 862
Bergen County, New Jersey
Essex County, New Jersey
Hudson County, New Jersey
Morris County, New Jersey
Passaic County, New Jersey
Sussex County, New Jersey
Telecommunications-related introductions in 2001